Hospitality refers to the relationship between a guest and a host, wherein the host receives the guest with goodwill.

Hospitality may also refer to:
 The hospitality industry, an umbrella term for several service industries including hotels, food service, casinos and tourism
 Hospitality service, a centrally-organized social network wherein travelers and tourists exchange accommodation without monetary exchange
 Hospitality (Hospitality album), 2012
 Hospitality (Venetian Snares album), 2006
 The Hospitality Branch, a tributary of the Great Egg Harbor River in southeastern New Jersey
 A brand of musical events hosted by Hospital Records.
 Hospitality (band), a Brooklyn, NY band on Merge Records.

See also
 Hospitality ethics
 Southern hospitality
 Hospital